The El homaydat are a tribe Houara tracking and tracing Bandar Qena, Qena Governorate has a population of more than 75,000. People have strong participation in the local elections, but competing seats in the People's Council is weak and because of the small number of people comparing the tribes competition tribes such as El ashraf and Arab tribes.

Ethnic groups in Egypt